is the sixth single of J-pop duo FictionJunction Yuuka. It was released on November 22, 2006.

This single included opening song of the anime Bakumatsu Kikansetsu Irohanihoheto, as well a song from the musical  in which Yuuka Nanri, the vocalist of FictionJunction Yuuka, stars in. Both songs were composed by Yuki Kajiura. Its catalog number is VICL-36177.

This single peaked at #13 on the Oricon weekly charts.

Track listing
From Flying Dog.

  
  Blessing
  
  Blessing (without vocal)

Charts 
Oricon Sales Chart (Japan)

(*): Sales after 2 weeks

External links 
Victor Animation Network: discography entry
Usenet group, sci.lang.Japan, discussion of the song lyrics.  .  The discussion thread includes the Japanese lyrics with translation and a romaji transliteration of the lyrics.  (Note:  In the discussion thread there is a link to a promotional video of the song at the Victor Entertainment official site.  The promotional video is no longer at this link having been replaced by more current content.)

References 

2006 singles
FictionJunction Yuuka songs
Songs written by Yuki Kajiura
2006 songs
Victor Entertainment singles